The discography of Australian electronic music group the Avalanches consists of three studio albums, five extended plays, four mixtapes, sixteen singles, and four music videos.

Trifekta Records released the group's debut single, "Rock City", in September 1997. In December, the group released the EP El Producto on Wondergram Records. Following the success of the EP, Wondergram head Steve Pavlovic signed the group to his new label, Modular Recordings. Additionally, Leo Silvermann signed the group to his Rex Records where they released the EP Undersea Community in March 1999. After numerous delays due to sample clearances and the need for overseas interest, the group released their debut album Since I Left You on 27 November 2000. The album was a surprise success, hitting the top ten in the United Kingdom as well as charting in Australia, France, and Norway. In the United States, the album peaked at number 10 on the Top Electronic Albums chart and at number 31 on the Top Heatseekers chart. Since I Left You was eventually certified platinum by the Australian Recording Industry Association (ARIA) and gold by the British Phonographic Industry (BPI). The album spawned five singles: "Electricity", "Frontier Psychiatrist", "Since I Left You", "Radio", and "A Different Feeling". "Frontier Psychiatrist" and "Since I Left You" were the most successful of the five singles, placing on the charts of Australia, Ireland, Norway, and the United Kingdom.

Albums

Studio albums

Mixtapes

Extended plays

Singles

Other appearances

Remix work

Music videos

References

External links
 Official website
 The Avalanches at AllMusic
 The Avalanches discography at Discogs
 

Discographies of Australian artists
Electronic music group discographies